Sentratisai Ventraperumal version was one among the release versions of Akilam which was released in 1965 and was named after Sentratisai Ventraperumal, who was one among the Payyan dynasty. It was the first release version other than the Palaramachandran version, which was the commonly accepted version. 

This version includes more than 2000 additional verse along with the other verse from Palaramacahandran version. It refers Mudisoodum Perumal as Malaikkutty. Also as per this version Mudisoodum Perumal was not the son of the Ponnu Madan, Veyilal couple and was a baby got from Marunthuvazh Malai when they were out there for gathering wood for cooking. This was rarely found among the followers and was not commonly accepted though some organisations claim it to the original text.

See also

 Akilattirattu Ammanai
 Arul Nool
 Ayyavazhi mythology

Akilattirattu Ammanai